The ammodile, walo or Somali gerbil (Ammodillus imbellis) is a species of rodent in the family Muridae. It is the only species in the genus Ammodillus. It is found in Ethiopia and Somaliland. Its natural habitat is subtropical or tropical dry lowland grassland. It is threatened by habitat loss.

References

Gerbils
Mammals of Ethiopia
Mammals of Somalia
Mammals described in 1898
Taxonomy articles created by Polbot